L’Aumône Abbey (also known as) is a former Cistercian monastery in the commune of La Colombe, Loir-et-Cher, France, 34 kilometres north of Blois in the Forêt de Cîteaux, part of the Forêt de Marchenoir.

History 
The abbey was founded in 1121, thanks to a gift from Count Theobald IV of Blois, as the seventh daughter house of Cîteaux Abbey. It became the mother house of 29 abbeys, including Waverley Abbey in England (the first Cistercian foundation in the British Isles), Bégard Abbey, Tintern Abbey, Langonnet Abbey and Le Landais Abbey.

The abbey suffered greatly during the Hundred Years' War and by 1396 lay mostly in ruins. The subsequent reconstruction and the introduction of commendatory abbots proved a serious burden.

The abbey was suppressed in 1791 during the French Revolution. The land was sold in 1818 and the debris from the ruins was used as building material.

Buildings 
Of the mediaeval structures there survive a 13th-century dovecote, two 15th-century buildings and a piece of the church wall. Some fragments of the cloister are in the museum in Blois.

References

Sources 
 Bernard Peugniez, 2001: Routier cistercien. Abbayes et sites. France, Belgique, Luxembourg, Suisse (new enlarged edition), p. 108 . Moisenay: Éditions Gaud.

External links 
 Abbaye Notre-Dame de l'Aumône 
  Certosa di Firenze website
 Cister.net

Cistercian monasteries in France
Buildings and structures in Loir-et-Cher
1121 establishments in Europe
1120s establishments in France
Christian monasteries established in the 12th century